Wushu was contested by both men and women at the 2001 East Asian Games in taolu and sanshou disciplines.

Medalists 
The results of only the taolu events have been persevered.

Men

Women

Medal table 
Taolu only

References 

Wushu at the East Asian Games
2001 East Asian Games
2001 in wushu (sport)